Fabienne Kabou (born 14 June 1977) is a Senegalese–French woman who was convicted of murder for the death of her 15-month-old daughter, Adélaïde, on 19 November 2013. She gave birth in secret and raised the child alone in Paris. Apparently mentally ill, Kabou traveled to Berck-sur-Mer with the intention of drowning the child and left her on a shore at night where she was found dead the next day. Kabou was arrested quickly and sentenced to 20 years in prison after a trial in June 2016.

The trial inspired the film Saint Omer (2022).

Events

Fabienne Kabou was born into a wealthy Catholic family in Dakar on 14 June 1977. Her father worked as a translator for the United Nations, her mother as a secretary. Kabou was a good student and apparently scored 130 on IQ tests. In 1995, she moved to France to study architecture and then philosophy, and was writing a thesis on Wittgenstein. She met a sculptor 30 years her senior named Michel Lafon with whom she became romantically involved, and she terminated two pregnancies while they were together. When she became pregnant a third time, she hid the fact from Lafon before giving birth to the child alone in their shared apartment in August 2012; the birth of the child, named Adélaïde ("Ada"), was not legally registered and unknown outside of the household, even to Kabou's mother. Kabou retreated from her academic and social life to raise Adélaïde; Lafon was apparently not interested in the child. Experiencing hallucinations and other conditions, Kabou spent €40,000 euros seeking help from "witchdoctors and healers" before the murder.

On 19 November 2013, Kabou took Adélaïde by train to the coastal town of Berck-sur-Mer, where she checked into a hotel room. She had told Lafon that she was bringing the child to Senegal to live with her mother. After dusk she walked on the beach with Adélaïde in a stroller and breastfed her, and later claimed to feel an unexplainable urge to abandon the child. She recalled, "I put an end to her life because it was easier that way. It was as if I felt carried along, I just couldn't say stop". She laid her almost asleep daughter down in the tide, hugged her for some minutes while asking for forgiveness, and then ran from the scene. Fishermen discovered the child's drowned body on the shore the next morning. Kabou returned to Paris that day.

The authorities arrested Kabou in Paris a few days after the incident; closed-circuit television had captured her trip. Kabou readily admitted to the plan of drowning Adélaïde.

Trial and aftermath

A trial for premeditated murder began in Saint-Omer on 20 June 2016 with a possibility of life imprisonment. Psychiatrists determined that Kabou was fit to stand trial despite suffering from "paranoid delirium". Kabou claimed that "evil forces" and "witchcraft" had inspired her to commit the act. A psychologist said that Senegalese traditions of witchcraft had "radically altered her view of the world", though the prosecution said that explanation was just a strategy for legal defense. Another psychologist suggested that postpartum depression was affecting her mental state. On 24 June 2016, Kabou was sentenced to 20 years in prison and ordered to receive psychological treatment.

Documentary filmmaker Alice Diop, who attended the trial, was inspired to write and direct a feature film based on the case. The film, named Saint Omer, premiered in 2022 at the Venice International Film Festival to positive reviews. Guslagie Malanda, who played the role based on Kabou, found being in character so taxing that she had nightmares for a year, while Diop fainted on set when the shooting wrapped.

References

Living people
1977 births
People from Dakar
Senegalese emigrants to France
French female murderers
French murderers of children
Senegalese people convicted of murder